Đurić (also transliterated Djuric) is a surname found in Croatia, Bosnia and Serbia, a patronymic derived from the male given name Đuro or Đura. Notable people with the surname include: 

 Aleksandar Đurić (born 1970), Bosnian-Singaporean footballer
 Antonije Đurić (1929–2020), Serbian journalist
 Branko Đurić (born 1962), Bosnian actor, comedian, director and musician
 Dusan Djuric (born 1984), Swedish footballer
 Igor Đurić (disambiguation), multiple people
 Mihailo Đurić (1925–2011), Serbian philosopher, professor
 Milan Đurić (born 1990), Bosnian footballer
 Miodrag Dado Đurić (1933–2010), Montenegrin painter
 Mitar Đurić (born 1989), Greek-Serbian volleyball player.
 Rajko Đurić, Serbian politician
 Sladjana Đurić (born 1964), Serbian scientist
 Stefan Đurić (born 1955), Serbian chess grandmaster
 Stanka Gjurić (born 1956), Croatian poet and writer
 Stipan Đurić (Gyurity István), Croatian-Hungarian actor, politician and folk singer
 Veljko Đurić Mišina (born 1953), Serbian historian

See also
 Đurović, surname
 Đurđević (disambiguation), surname
 Đurovski, surname
 Đurica, surname
 Jurić, surname
 Bácsszentgyörgy, village in Hungary known in Serbian as Đurić

Serbian surnames
Patronymic surnames
Croatian surnames
Surnames from given names